The 1998 Internazionali di Carisbo was a men's tennis tournament played on outdoor clay courts at the Cierrebi Club in Bologna, Italy that was part of the International Series of the 1998 ATP Tour. It was the fourteenth and final edition of the tournament and was held from 8 June until 14 June 1998. Third-seeded Julián Alonso won the singles title.

Finals

Singles

 Julián Alonso defeated  Karim Alami, 6–1, 6–4.

Doubles

 Brandon Coupe /  Paul Rosner defeated  Giorgio Galimberti /  Massimo Valeri, 7–6, 6–3.

References

Internazionali di Carisbo
Bologna Outdoor
1998 in Italian tennis